Calandrelli is a surname. Notable people with the surname include:
 Alexander Calandrelli (1834–1903), German sculptor of Italian descent
 Giuseppe Calandrelli (1749–1827), Italian priest and astronomer
 Ignazio Calandrelli (1792–1866), Italian priest and astronomer (nephew of Giuseppe)
 Jorge Calandrelli, Argentine composer, arranger and orchestrator
 Susana Calandrelli (1901–1978), Argentine writer and teacher

Italian-language surnames